Pterygoplichthys ambrosettii, sometimes known as the snow king pleco, is a species of armored catfish native to south-central South America.

Distribution and habitat
This species is distributed in the Río Plata basin, in the Paraguay, Middle Paraná, Bermejo, and Uruguay rivers, in the countries of Paraguay, Bolivia, the north/northeast of Argentina, and the west of Uruguay. It is a typical species of the Paraná lower freshwater ecoregion.

Invasive tendencies
It was not originally present in the upper Paraná River, but due to flooding of geological barriers (Sete Quedas waterfalls) the species was able to expand their territory. This was due to the installation of the Itaipu hydroelectric power plant.

Taxonomy
The species was originally described in the year 1893 by the physician, naturalist and writer Argentine Eduardo Ladislao Holmberg, under the scientific term for Liposarcus ambrosettii using samples caught in the Paraguay River, opposite the city of Formosa. It is included in the Hypostominae subfamily.

Etymology
Etymologically, the generic name Pterygoplichthys is constructed with three words of the Greek language, where: pterygion is the diminutive of pteryx that means 'fin', hoplon is 'weapon', and ichthys is 'fish'. The specific term ambrosettii honors the surname of Argentine naturalist Juan Bautista Ambrosetti.

Taxonomic history
Pterygoplichthys anisitsi was described in 1903 by the German-American ichthyologist Carl H. Eigenmann along with Clarence Hamilton Kennedy. These scientists were originally credited more so with its discovery since the description made by Holmberg went unnoticed, so in 1992 C. Webber passed the latter to the category of nomen oblitum.  However, the epithet of P. ambrosettii had been cited as the valid name for this fish by Isaäc Isbrüker in 1980. Other authors began to agree, so in 2007 Carl J. Ferraris Jr. determined that, being the oldest available name, it corresponds to being the senior synonym, becoming P. anisitsi to be its minor synonym.

References

Hypostominae
Taxa named by Eduardo Ladislao Holmberg
Fish described in 1893
Fish of Paraguay
Fish of Bolivia
Fish of Argentina
Fish of Uruguay